Philipp Röppnack (born 21 November 1989 in Jena) is a German footballer playing for SSV Markranstädt.

Career 
Röppnack began his career with FC Carl Zeiss Jena youth team. In his first season in 2007–08 he played twenty-five games and scored two goals in the A-Jugend Bundesliga Nord/Nordost and was promoted in July 2008 to the reserve team. After 22 games was promoted to the first team of FC Carl Zeiss Jena in Mai 2009.

References

External links 
 

1989 births
Living people
Sportspeople from Jena
People from Bezirk Gera
German footballers
Footballers from Thuringia
Association football defenders
3. Liga players
FC Carl Zeiss Jena players
FC Einheit Rudolstadt players